The Belarusian Gymnasium of Vilnia was an important Belarusian school in Vilnius. Many notable Belarusian cultural figures of the 20th century graduated from the school.

History
The Belarusian Gymnasium of Vilnius was founded in early 1919, by the allowance of the Council of Lithuania and functioned later during the Interbellum, when the city belonged to Poland. Prior to their retreat from the city to Kaunas, Lithuanians allowed opening of the gymnasium in the premises of the former Basilian monastery. The lessons started on 1 February 1919.

In the first year of its existence the school also served as an Orphanage for children from surrounding regions. After the Soviet occupation of Republic of Lithuania in 1944 the school was closed down. It was reestablished after the Collapse of the USSR as the Francishak Skaryna Belarusian School of Vilnius.

Teachers

 Radasłaŭ Astroŭski, Principal from 1924 to 1936; formerly Education Minister of the Belarusian Democratic Republic in 1918 and head of the Belarusian Central Rada after 1944
 Barys Kit, teacher since 1933, Principal in 1939. Later notable scientist in the United States and member of the Belarusian American community

Alumni and students

 Michał Vituška, general and military commander
 Vincent Žuk-Hryškievič, president of the Belarusian Democratic Republic in exile
Raisa Žuk-Hryškievič
 Jan Stankievič, linguist, historian and philosopher
 Maxim Tank, poet and translator
 Boris Koverda, White Russian assassin, killer of Pyotr Voykov (left school before graduation)
Lavon Rydleŭski, Vice-President of the Rada of the Belarusian Democratic Republic
Natallia Arsiennieva, playwright, poet, translator, author of the lyrics to the hymn "Mahutny Boža” (Almighty God)

External links
 The Francishak Skaryna Belarusian School of Vilnius
 Юбілей беларускага школьніцтва ў Вільні // Рэгіянальны партал «Сьвіслач»
 Гісторыя школы і гімназіі // Віленская сярэдняя школа імя Францішка Скарыны

Schools in Belarus
Schools in Lithuania